Miguel Ángel Montuori (24 September 1932 – 4 June 1998) was an Argentine-Italian football player, who played as a forward and as an attacking midfielder. He is regarded as one of Fiorentina's greatest players of all time, due to his technique, creativity, eye for goal, and playmaking ability. Despite his talent and success, he was also regarded as an "unfortunate" player, due to his many runner-up medals, and his injuries, which forced him to retire during the prime of his career.

Biography
Montuori was born in Rosario, Argentina. His mother was of Afro-Argentinian descent, while his father was an Italian of Neapolitan origin. He died in Florence in 1998, from an incurable illness.

Club career

Despite his Argentine origins, Montuori began his career with Universidad Católica in Santiago, Chile, in 1953, winning the Chilean Primera División in 1954, scoring 24 goals in 26 league appearances for the club. He subsequently moved to play with ACF Fiorentina in Italy in the summer of 1955, at the request of club president Enrico Befani, and was handed the number 10 shirt. He played at the club from 1955 to 1961, making 162 Serie A appearances, and scoring 72 goals. In the Coppa Italia he played 13 matches scoring 6 goals, and in the 1956–57 European Cup he played 7 games and scored 1 goal, helping the team to the final. He also played 2 matches in the Mitropa Cup with Fiorentina.

With Fiorentina, Montuori was able to achieve great domestic and international success, as well as international recognition; upon his arrival at the club, he won the only Italian title of his career, during the 1955–56 season, and he followed this triumph with four consecutive second places. He was also able to win the 1960–61 European Cup Winners' Cup, and the 1960–61 Coppa Italia, also reaching the final of the Italian Cup three consecutive times between 1958 and 1960. He also won several minor international trophies with Fiorentina, such as the Grasshoppers Cup in 1957, the Coppa dell'Amicizia twice, in 1959 and 1960, as well as the Coppa delle Alpi in 1960. Montuori's playing career ended prematurely, at the age of 28, in the spring of 1961. During an away friendly match against Perugia, he was hit strongly in the face by the ball, which caused his retina to detach, and his vision to blur, leading him to retire from professional football.

International career
Despite being born in Argentina, Montuori represented the Italy national football team, making his debut against France in 1956, and making his final appearance against Switzerland in 1960. He also became the first non-Italian born player to captain Italy, wearing the captain's armband in a friendly match against Spain, in Rome, on 28 February 1959. With Italy, he received 12 international caps and scored 2 goals.

Honours

Club
Universidad Católica
Chilean Primera División: 1954

Fiorentina
Serie A: 1955–56
Coppa Italia: 1960–61
European Cup Winners' Cup: 1960–61
Coppa dell'Amicizia: 1958–59, 1959–60
Coppa delle Alpi: 1959–60

Individual
Fiorentina Hall of Fame: 2016

MONTUORI STARTED PLAYING IN RACING CLUB.ARGENTINA
Oriundo

References

External links
Fiorentina profile 

1932 births
1998 deaths
Footballers from Rosario, Santa Fe
Argentine footballers
Argentine expatriate footballers
Italian footballers
Italy international footballers
Chilean Primera División players
Club Deportivo Universidad Católica footballers
Expatriate footballers in Chile
Expatriate football managers in Chile
Serie A players
ACF Fiorentina players
People of Campanian descent
Association football midfielders
Argentine people of Italian descent
Citizens of Italy through descent
Argentine football managers
Afro-Argentine sportspeople
Italian sportspeople of African descent
Italian people of Argentine descent